Airy Hill is a historic home located at Chestertown, Kent County, Maryland, United States. It is a two-section dwelling consisting of a -story frame wing and a two-story Federal-style brick house. The brick section was added in the early 1790s, together with a middle section that now connects the two. Also on the property is a brick smokehouse and an early-19th-century cemetery.

Airy Hill was listed on the National Register of Historic Places in 1996.

References

External links
, including photo from 1996, at Maryland Historical Trust

Houses on the National Register of Historic Places in Maryland
Houses in Kent County, Maryland
Federal architecture in Maryland
Historic American Buildings Survey in Maryland
National Register of Historic Places in Kent County, Maryland